Mayas-USA was a team of the former World Basketball Association that began play in 2007. It was owned by the Liga Nacional Balonocesto Professional (the primary basketball league in Mexico)'s Mayas de Yucatan, and played its games in Dallas, Texas. Mayas-USA defeated the Gwinnett Ravia-Rebels 114 to 104 in the 2007 league championship game.

External links
Official site
Press release announcing team

World Basketball Association teams
Sports in Dallas
2006 establishments in Texas
Basketball teams established in 2006